Yola North is a Local Government Area of Adamawa State, Nigeria. It includes Jimeta. It is a suburb of Yola (Yola South).

Yola is the administrative capital of Adamawa State in Nigeria's northeastern region.

References

Local Government Areas in Adamawa State